Jan-Frederick Göhsl (born 28 January 1993) is a German footballer who plays as a defender for Germania Windeck.

Career
Göhsl made his professional debut for Alemannia Aachen on 23 February 2013, coming on as a substitute in the 84th minute for Mario Erb in the 3–0 home win against Stuttgarter Kickers.

References

External links
 Profile at DFB.de
 Profile at kicker.de

1993 births
Living people
People from Oberbergischer Kreis
Sportspeople from Cologne (region)
Footballers from North Rhine-Westphalia
German footballers
Association football defenders
Alemannia Aachen players
3. Liga players